C.D. Davidsmeyer (born 1979) is a member of the Illinois House of Representatives who has served in the Illinois House of Representatives since his appointment in December 2012. He represents the 100th district which includes all or parts of Calhoun County, Greene County, Jersey County, Macoupin County, Madison County, Morgan County, Pike County, Sangamon County and Scott County.

Davidsmeyer was born in Jacksonville, Illinois on July 12, 1979 and graduated from Jacksonville High School. He received a Bachelor of Arts in political science from Miami University and worked as a legislative aide for Congressman John Shimkus. He served on the Jacksonville City Council from 2008 to 2012.

In the 2012 general election, Republican incumbent Jim Watson of the 97th district was reelected to the Illinois House from the new 100th district. On December 3, 2012, Jim Watson resigned to take a position with the Illinois Petroleum Council. The Republican Representative Committee of the 97th Representative District appointed Davidsmeyer to fill the subsequent vacancy for the remainder of the 97th General Assembly and later as the representative from the 100th district for the 98th General Assembly. Davidsmeyer was sworn into office on December 12, 2012.

As of July 3, 2022, Representative Davidsmeyer is a member of the following Illinois House committees:

 Appropriations - Human Services Committee (HAPH)
 Appropriations - Public Safety Committee (HAPP)
 Executive Committee (HEXC)
 Financial Institutions Committee (HFIN)
 Public Utilities Committee (HPUB)
 Small Cell Subcommittee (HPUB-SCEL)

References

External links
Representative C.D. Davidsmeyer (R) 100th District at the Illinois General Assembly
By session: 98th, 97th
State Representative C.D. Davidsmeyer constituency site
 

1979 births
Living people
Businesspeople from Illinois
Politicians from Jacksonville, Illinois
Miami University alumni
Illinois city council members
Republican Party members of the Illinois House of Representatives
21st-century American politicians